John Tyrrell or Tyrell may refer to:

 Sir John Tyrrell (died 1437), 15th-century English knight, Speaker of House of Commons
 Sir John Tyrell (died 1676), MP
 John Tyrrell (Royal Navy officer) (1646–1692), English second Admiral of the East Indies
 Sir John Tyrrell (1685–1729), one of the Lords Proprietors of Carolina; Tyrrell County, North Carolina named after him
 John Tyrrell (actor) (1900–1949), American actor
 Sir John Tyrell, 2nd Baronet (1795–1877), MP for Essex
 John Tyrrell (musicologist) (1942–2018), executive editor of 2nd Edition of Grove Dictionary of Music and Musicians